Pedro Henrique Estumano da Costa (born 24 October 1991), known simply as Pedro Costa, is a Brazilian footballer who plays as a forward for Portuguese club Clube Atletico Molelos.

Career statistics

Club
}

Notes

References

1991 births
Living people
Brazilian footballers
Brazilian expatriate footballers
Association football forwards
Sport Club Internacional players
Ceará Sporting Club players
Associação Académica de Coimbra – O.A.F. players
FC Pampilhosa players
Académico de Viseu F.C. players
Sertanense F.C. players
C.D. Tondela players
F.C. Vizela players
G.D. Tourizense players
Lusitano FCV players
Floridsdorfer AC players
NK Krško players
Segunda Divisão players
Austrian Football Bundesliga players
Slovenian Second League players
Brazilian expatriate sportspeople in Portugal
Brazilian expatriate sportspeople in Austria
Brazilian expatriate sportspeople in Slovenia
Expatriate footballers in Portugal
Expatriate footballers in Austria
Expatriate footballers in Slovenia
Sportspeople from Fortaleza